A flying duck race (Indonesian: Pacu Itiak) is a tradition in Payakumbuh, West Sumatra  where ducks fly towards a specified finish line.

Young female ducks (4–6 months old) that cannot fully fly are used, and ducks are numbered on their bills. Races are held weekly in different areas, along streets or over rice fields. The races are accompanied with music and parade activities.

References

West Sumatra culture
Ducks